The 2021–22 Minnesota Golden Gophers men's basketball team represented the University of Minnesota in the 2021–22 NCAA Division I men's basketball season. The Gophers were led by first-year head coach Ben Johnson and played their home games at Williams Arena in Minneapolis, Minnesota as members of the Big Ten Conference. They finished the season 13–17, 4–16 in Big Ten play to finish in a tie for last place. As the No. 14 seed in the Big Ten tournament, they lost to Penn State in the first round.

Previous season
In a season limited due to the ongoing COVID-19 pandemic, the Gophers finished the 2020–21 season 14–15, 6–14 in Big Ten play to finish in 13th place. They defeated Northwestern in the first round of the Big Ten tournament before losing to Ohio State in the second round. 

Following the season, the school fired head coach Richard Pitino after eight years at the school. On March 23, 2021, the school named Minnesota alum and former Minnesota assistant coach Ben Johnson the new head coach.

Offseason

Departures

Incoming transfers

Recruiting classes

2021 recruiting class

2022 Recruiting class

Roster

Schedule and results

|-
!colspan=9 style=| Exhibition

|-
! colspan="9" style=|Regular season

|-
! colspan="9" style=|Big Ten tournament

Source

Rankings

*AP does not release post-NCAA Tournament rankings^Coaches did not release a Week 1 poll.

References

2020–21
Minnesota
2021 in sports in Minnesota